Cameron Timothy Bancroft (born 19 November 1992) is an Australian cricketer contracted to Western Australia in Australian first class cricket, Durham in English first class cricket, and the Perth Scorchers in the Big Bash League. He made his Test debut for the Australian national team in November 2017.

As a result of a Cricket Australia investigation into a ball tampering incident during the 3rd Test against South Africa in March 2018, Bancroft and two others, captain Steve Smith and vice-captain David Warner, were charged by Cricket Australia on 27 March 2018 with bringing the game into disrepute, suspended, and sent home from the tour. The next day, as a result of his involvement in the ball tampering incident, Cricket Australia banned Bancroft from all international and domestic cricket for nine months and was banned from any leadership role in Australian cricket for an additional year. Bancroft made his return to cricket on 30 December 2018, playing for the Perth Scorchers in the 2018–19 Big Bash League season. Bancroft scored 138 not out on his Sheffield Shield  return as well.

Youth and domestic career
After playing under-17, under-19 and under-23 cricket for Western Australia, Bancroft played several under-19 Tests and One Day Internationals for the Australia Under-19 cricket team, impressing after scoring three centuries, at an average of 50.90. In August 2012, Bancroft played in the 2012 ICC Under-19 Cricket World Cup, where he scored the second highest number of runs.

He made his List A debut for Western Australia against Tasmania on 16 October 2011 and his first-class debut a week later.

International career
Bancroft was selected in the Australian Test squad to tour Bangladesh; however, that tour was cancelled for security reasons. Bancroft and the rest of the team returned to their states.

He made his Twenty20 International debut for Australia against India on 31 January 2016.

In November 2017, he was named in Australia's Test squad for the 2017–18 Ashes series. He replaced Matt Renshaw as an opening batsman  and became the first Australian opener to make his debut in an Ashes Test since Michael Slater in 1993.

Bancroft had his baggy green cap presented to him by Geoff Marsh. In his first Test innings, he scored 5 and 82 not out to help give Australia a 10 wicket victory against England. He played in all five Tests in that series.

Ball-tampering incident and suspension

Bancroft was selected for the 2018 tour of South Africa and played in the first three Tests.

In March 2018, Bancroft admitted to ball tampering against South Africa in the third Test match held in Cape Town. During the match, television footage showed Bancroft rubbing the ball with sandpaper. On discovering that footage of the incident had been broadcast, Bancroft put the sandpaper down the front of his trousers before being spoken to by the on-field umpires.

At a later press conference captain Steve Smith admitted that the plan to tamper with the ball was concocted by the team "leadership group." The ICC later imposed a one match ban on Steve Smith and handed over 3 demerit points to Cameron Bancroft after the alleged ball tampering controversy. Cricket Australia then imposed further sanctions against Bancroft, Smith and David Warner, meaning they would not take part in the fourth Test. Cricket Australia launched a separate investigation into the incident as a matter of urgency.

Cricket Australia CEO James Sutherland announced that as a result of the preliminary investigation into the incident Smith, Warner and Bancroft had been charged with bringing the game into disrepute, suspended and sent home. David Warner was later found to be responsible for the development of the plan to tamper with the ball and instructing Bancroft on how to do it. Bancroft was found to have carried out those instructions, tried to conceal evidence and mislead match officials by denying knowledge of the tampering. As a result, Bancroft received a 9-month ban from international and domestic cricket in Australia and was banned from any leadership role for 1 year after the initial ban was completed.

Somerset County Cricket Club announced that Bancroft would not be joining the county as their overseas player for the 2018 season as previously planned.

Return to Cricket
Bancroft made a return to professional cricket on 30 December 2018, playing for the Perth Scorchers in the 2018–19 Big Bash League season. In the match he scored 2 runs from three balls, with the Hobart Hurricanes going on to win the game by 6 wickets. Although he only scored 2 runs in his first game back for the Perth Scorchers, he went on to make 296 runs in 10 games in the season, including a Career Best knock of 87* against the Sydney Sixers, in which he was awarded man of the match.

In February 2019 Bancroft returned to first-class cricket, playing for Western Australia against New South Wales in the 2018–19 Sheffield Shield. He made an unbeaten 138 in the first innings and 86 in the second. Bancroft faced a total of 621 balls in the match, falling 28 balls short of former Australian Captain Steve Waugh's record of most balls faced in a Shield match.

Later in the year he was appointed as captain of Durham County Cricket Club in England for the 2019 season. While the move to make him captain was criticised by some members of the public, it was supported by Durham director of cricket Marcus North and former Australian Captain and Teammate Steve Smith. In his one-day debut for Durham, Bancroft scored 150 not out off 130 balls against Northamptonshire.

2019 Ashes series 
In July 2019, he was named in Australia's squad for the 2019 Ashes series in England. He made his international return in the first test at Edgbaston at the beginning of August. He played the first two Tests, but after scores of 8, 7, 13 and 16, was dropped for the third Test.

References

External links

1992 births
Living people
Australian cricketers
Australian expatriate sportspeople in England
Australia Test cricketers
Australia Twenty20 International cricketers
Cricketers from Perth, Western Australia
Western Australia cricketers
Perth Scorchers cricketers
Sportsmen from Western Australia
Gloucestershire cricketers
Durham cricketers